The MV Namura Queen is a Japanese-owned, Panamanian-registered, and Philippine-operated bulk carrier cargo ship.

Characteristics 
The Namura Queen is a Panamax-sized bulk carrier built by the Japanese shipbuilding company Sasebo Heavy Industries. Registered in Panama, its crew consists of twenty people, all of whom are Filipinos. It has a gross tonnage of 47,146 tons and a deadweight tonnage of 85,065 tons. The ship has seven holds for storing the grain it transports. It is propelled by a single fixed pitch propeller powered by a diesel engine creating .

Shelling incident 
On 15 February 2022, the Namura Queen departed from Porto Torres, Italy, and went underway to the Ukrainian port city of Yuzhne to receive a shipment of grain, arriving on 23 February. On 25 February, while in transit in the Black Sea, heading to Istanbul, Turkey, after departing from Yuzhne, the cargo ship was struck on its stern side by ordnance fired from a Russian warship participating in the 2022 Russian invasion of Ukraine. The explosion caused a fire to start on the ship, and one of the twenty crew received a slight injury to their shoulder. The Namura Queen was able to continue under its own propulsion, but it was assisted to a port in Yalova, Turkey, by the Ukrainian tugboat P&O Star, arriving on 27 February.

See also

References 

2020 ships
Maritime incidents in 2022
Ships involved in the 2022 Russian invasion of Ukraine
Bulk carriers
Ships built in Japan
Merchant ships of Japan
Military history of the Black Sea